The tasselled nudibranch, scientific name Kaloplocamus ramosus, is a species of sea slug, a dorid nudibranch, and a marine gastropod mollusc in the family Polyceridae.

Distribution
This species was described from the Mediterranean Sea. It has subsequently been reported from south-eastern Australia and Japan, Hong Kong and Korea. It is also found off the South African coast, where it occurs from Hout Bay on the Cape Peninsula to the Wild Coast. It lives at depths from  25–400 m.

Description
The tasselled nudibranch is very well-camouflaged; it usually cannot be noticed underwater without using a torch. The body is pale with variable amounts of reddish-pink pigmentation and is covered with raised white spots. Numerous branched projections on the notum aid in camouflage, and may be extended or retracted. This nudibranch has large perfoliate rhinophores, which are usually pinkish in color. The gills are spotted with red pigmentation.

References

External links

SeaSlug Forum info

Polyceridae
Gastropods described in 1835